Creative Source was an American R&B group from Los Angeles, who had several funk and disco hits during the 1970s.

History
Creative Source was formed in 1972 by several veterans of the West Coast recording studios. They were managed by Ron Townson, who was a member of The Fifth Dimension. Their first chart success was 1973's "You Can't Hide Love", but their biggest hit came the following year, a cover of the Bill Withers tune "Who Is He (And What Is He to You)?". Four albums were issued by the band in three years, but their later singles were less successful, and by 1977, after having lost their recording contract, the group disbanded.

Discography

Albums

Singles

References

External links
 

American soul musical groups
American rhythm and blues musical groups
Musical groups from Los Angeles